Samuel Bernard Nunez Jr., (January 27, 1930 – January 15, 2012), was a Louisiana politician and businessman from Chalmette, the seat of St. Bernard Parish in the New Orleans suburbs.

From 1964 to 1969, Nunez was a member of the Louisiana House of Representatives. From 1969 to 1996, the Democrat Nunez was a state senator. He was the State Senate President from 1983 to 1988 and from 1990 to 1996, when his legislative tenure ended in defeat. He was the State Senate President Pro Tempore from 1980 to 1983 and 1988 to 1990. In 1973, he was a delegate to the Louisiana State Constitutional Convention, where he pushed for inclusion of the homestead exemption on property taxes.

Background

Nunez graduated from Joseph Maumus High School in Arabi in St. Bernard Parish. From 1951 to 1955, he served in the United States Air Force during the Korean War era. Following his Air Force service, he received a Bachelor of Science degree from Louisiana State University in Baton Rouge.

In 1983, Nunez became Senate President by acclamation when Michael H. O'Keefe of New Orleans was indicted, maintained his innocence, but was ultimately convicted of a federal crime and imprisoned.

Political career
After a month of consideration, Nunez endorsed Breaux over Moore. 

Nunez was one of several pro-gambling legislators who were defeated or forced to retire following the 1995 legislative session. Two of Nunez' most prominent Senate colleagues, Armand Brinkhaus of Sunset in St. Landry Parish and Sixty Rayburn of Bogalusa in Washington Parish, lost re-election bids, while Senators Larry Bankston of Baton Rouge and Gerry Hinton of Slidell stood down. Also failing in his re-election bid was Rep. Raymond Lalonde of Sunset, the author of the 1992 bill which allowed for a land-based casino to operate in New Orleans.

Senator Dean served two terms and was succeeded in 2004 by the Republican, later Democrat, Walter Boasso. As a Democrat, Boasso finished a distant second to Republican Bobby Jindal in the 2007 governor's race, as Jindal easily captured the requisite majority n the primary to avoid a runoff.

Later years and legacy

Long after his legislative service, Nunez was a member of the board of commissioners of the Port of New Orleans.
He operated an insurance agency.

Notes

External links

1930 births
2012 deaths
American businesspeople in insurance
American people of Spanish descent
Deaths from Parkinson's disease
Neurological disease deaths in Louisiana
Deaths from pneumonia in Louisiana
Louisiana Isleño people
Democratic Party Louisiana state senators
Louisiana State University alumni
Democratic Party members of the Louisiana House of Representatives
Politicians from New Orleans
People from Plaquemines Parish, Louisiana
People from Chalmette, Louisiana
United States Air Force airmen
Businesspeople from New Orleans
20th-century American businesspeople